Rabbit Ears Productions is a production company best known for producing three television series that feature individual episodes adapting popular pieces of children's literature. Rabbit Ears episodes have been released on home video, broadcast on Showtime, and reran on PBS. The series features actors such as Robin Williams, Raul Julia, Laura Dern, Denzel Washington, Meryl Streep, John Hurt, Danny Glover, and others narrating children's books either well known in the United States or from around the world. The series made use of a limited animation technique whereby still images were moved throughout the scene, similar to modern motion comics. Rabbit Ears Productions has also won numerous awards, including Parents' Choice Awards and Grammy Awards.

Stories

Storybook Classics
From 1984 to 1990, Rabbit Ears Productions created a set of storybook classics that were well-known around the world. Probably the most popular storybook classic from Rabbit Ears Productions was The Velveteen Rabbit, the first story that Rabbit Ears Productions had created. The Velveteen Rabbit also received many awards such as Parents' Choice Award and a nomination for a Grammy Award. Showtime acquired the broadcast rights to Storybook Classics in 1987.

We All Have Tales
From 1991 to 1995, Rabbit Ears Productions created the next set of stories which were those that come from all around the world, including countries such as Russia, France, Jamaica, England, Germany, Colombia, Scandinavia, Japan and India.

American Heroes and Legends
From 1992 to 1993, Rabbit Ears Productions made another set of stories that come from the US, about great American heroes such as John Henry, Johnny Appleseed, and many other heroes and heroines that made a great impact on American society.

The Greatest Stories Ever Told
From 1991 to 1993, Rabbit Ears Productions created their final installment, relating to stories from the Bible. Seven of them focus with Bible stories from the Old Testament (including The Creation, Noah and the Ark, Joseph and his Brothers, Moses in Egypt, Moses the Lawgiver, David and Goliath, and Jonah and the Whale). These seven stories are stories from the Old Testament books (Genesis, Exodus, Samuel, and Jonah). There are four more stories that are from the New Testament (including The Saviour is Born, The Sower, The Good Samaritan, and The Prodigal Son). In The Greatest Stories Ever Told, The Creation was the first story published in 1991. This series was not shown on television.

Holiday Classics
Holiday Classics are stories that are found throughout all the Rabbit Ears Productions series, whether they are Christmas, Halloween, or Easter-themed.

Cast and Stories

Cast
 Holly Hunter: told The Three Billy Goats Gruff / The Three Little Pigs
 Meg Ryan: told Red Riding Hood / Goldilocks
 Denzel Washington: told John Henry / Anansi
 Robin Williams: told The Fool and the Flying Ship / Pecos Bill
 Jonathan Winters: told Paul Bunyan
 Danny Glover: told Brer Rabbit and Boss Lion / Brer Rabbit and the Wonderful Tar Baby / How the Leopard Got His Spots / Moses in Egypt
 Meryl Streep: told The Tale of Mr. Jeremy Fisher / The Tale of Peter Rabbit / The Velveteen Rabbit / The Night Before Christmas / The Tailor of Gloucester
 Glenn Close: told The Emperor and the Nightingale / The Legend of Sleepy Hollow
 John Hurt: told Aladdin and the Magic Lamp
 Raul Julia: told The Monkey People
 Kelly McGillis: told Thumbelina / Noah and the Ark
 Laura Dern: told The Song of Sacajawea
 John Candy: told Stormalong
 Morgan Freeman: told Follow the Drinking Gourd / The Savior is Born
 Jack Nicholson: told The Elephant's Child / How the Rhinoceros got his Skin / How the Camel got his Hump
 Sigourney Weaver: told Peachboy
 Whoopi Goldberg: told Koi and the Kola Nuts
 John Lone: told The Five Chinese Brothers
 Anjelica Huston: told Rip Van Winkle
 Ben Kingsley: told The Tiger and the Brahmin / Moses the Law-giver
 Jason Robards: told Jonah and the Whale
 Nicolas Cage: told Davy Crockett
 Mel Gibson: told David and Goliath
 Garrison Keillor: told Johnny Appleseed / Parables that Jesus Told
 Bob Hoskins: told The Bremen Town Musicians
 Rubén Blades: told Joseph and his Brothers
 Amy Grant: told The Creation / The Gingham Dog and the Calico Cat / The Lion and the Lamb
 Christopher Reeve: told The Lion and The Lamb
 Keith Carradine: told Annie Oakley
 Michael Keaton: told Mose the Fireman
 Jodie Foster: told The Fisherman and His Wife
 Geena Davis: told Princess Scargo and the Birthday Pumpkin
 Graham Greene: told Squanto and the First Thanksgiving
 Susan Saint James: told A Gingerbread Christmas
 Max von Sydow: told East of the Sun, West of the Moon
 Susan Sarandon: told The Firebird
 John Gielgud: told The Emperor's New Clothes
 Jeremy Irons: told The Steadfast Tin Soldier
 Sissy Spacek: told The Talking Eggs
 Cher: told The Ugly Duckling
 Emma Thompson: told The White Cat
 John Cleese: told Tom Thumb
 Kathleen Turner: told Rumpelstiltskin
 Danny Aiello: told Pinocchio
 William Hurt: told The Boy Who Drew Cats
 Tracey Ullman: told Puss in Boots
 Michael Palin: told Jack and the Beanstalk
 Michael Caine: told King Midas and the Golden Touch
 Catherine O'Hara: told Finn McCoul

Crew
 Mark Sottnick: Executive Producer, Producer, Director
 Mike Pogue: Executive Producer
 Eric Metaxas: Writer
 Brian Gleeson: Writer
 C.W. Rogers: Animation Department, Film Editing, Production Design
 Tim Raglin: Illustrator, Art Direction, Director
 Paul Elliott: Art Director
 Ken Hoin: Producer
 Doris Wilhousky: Executive Producer
 Susan C. Anderson: Production Director

Episodes

Storybook Classics

We All Have Tales

American Heroes and Legends

The Greatest Stories Ever Told: 1991–1994

Holiday Classics: 1986–1994

Audiobooks
Many of the stories have been made available as audiobooks through Listening Library.

References

External links
 Rabbit Ears Entertainment,LLC

Television production companies of the United States
Entertainment companies established in 1984
Mass media companies established in 1984
1984 establishments in the United States